Meera Krishna  is an Indian television actress known for her work in Malayalam and Tamil television soap operas.

Filmography

Television

Serials

Shows

References

Actresses from Kottayam
Living people
Actresses in Malayalam television
Actresses in Tamil television
Actresses in Malayalam cinema
Actresses in Telugu cinema
1987 births